The Chrysler Formation is a geologic formation in New York. It preserves fossils dating back to the Silurian / Devonian period.

See also

 List of fossiliferous stratigraphic units in New York

References

 

Silurian geology of New York (state)
Silurian southern paleotemperate deposits